CBN Asia or Christian Broadcasting Networks Asia is a non-stock, nonprofit corporation established in the Philippines and Hong Kong on October 1, 1994. Its vision, mission, and ministries are inspired by those of the Christian Broadcasting Network (CBN), founded in the United States by televangelist Pat Robertson in 1961 and now one of the world's largest mass media Christian television organizations.

Strategy
CBN Asia undertakes several ministries in reaching Asian nations with the Gospel. Its major thrust is through The 700 Club Asia, a locally produced weeknight television program, as well as other TV specials that are viewed nationwide and in other countries around the world. Its ministries include then humanitarian aid foundation called Operation Blessing Foundation. The Asian Center for Missions enables reaching different people groups in Asia through the deployment of Asian cross-cultural missionaries.

ACM's missionary strategy is to train and deploy Asians as church-planting teams utilizing community development and other holistic ministries to reach the unevangelized.

Asian center for missions
The Asian Center for Missions was formed in response to Christ's call to “go and make disciples of all nations . . .” (Matthew 28:19). It is not exclusively a CBN Asia project, but an Asia-wide network for spreading the Gospel, comprising the following ministries: Philippines for Jesus Movement (PJM), the Philippine Council of Evangelical Churches (PCEC), the Asian Seminary of Christian Ministries (ASCM), the International Bible Society, and other Asian church and fellowship groups.

Operation blessing foundation
Operation Blessing Foundation Philippines, Inc. (OB) is a non-profit humanitarian aid foundation that provides short-term medical, disaster relief, feeding and community development assistance to economically disadvantaged people in the Philippines and Asia. OB is committed to responding with appropriate resources to people in dire need by mobilizing volunteer medical teams, logistics and other trained emergency relief personnel to handle the procurement, transportation and distribution of food, clothing, medical and other supplies. OB continues to enhance its capacity to provide community assistance programs to serve as many people as possible.

Structure
OB works with the appropriate government agencies, such as the Department of Health and the Department of Social Welfare and Development, and with non-government organizations in the target localities. It is duly registered with the Bureau of Internal Revenue and the Department of Social Welfare and Development as a donee institution.

Background
OB is the Asian counterpart of the US-based Operation Blessing International. Since 1994, OB humanitarian missions have expanded their reach from areas all over the Philippines to other Asian countries like China, India, Indonesia, Thailand and Taiwan. In 1996, OB officially became the humanitarian arm of CBN Asia, Inc. which was founded by Gordon Robertson, son of The Christian Broadcasting Network Chairman and Founder M.G. “Pat” Robertson.

Programs
 The 700 Club Asia (GMA Network, 1995–2002, 2015–present; ABS-CBN & ABC, 2002–2006; Studio 23 (defunct), 2003–2006; Q/GMA News TV, 2006–2015 (including live telethon specials); Light Network, 2011–present)
 A.S.T.I.G. (All Set To Imitate God) (ABC, 7 May 2005–2006)
 One Cubed (GMA Network, 1999–2001; ABS-CBN, 2002–2006)
 SuperBook Reimagine and SuperBook Classics (GMA Network, 2013–2014; ABS-CBN, 2014–2017, re-run, 2019–2020 on Season 4; A2Z, 2020-present) (3D and Classic versions)

Development Program for Impoverished Children
A community development assistance program involving feeding, medical, dental, and educational projects for impoverished children in Payatas, Commonwealth, Las Piñas and other underprivileged areas. Livelihood programs for children's parents and guardians are also provided. Special holiday gift-giving outreaches and values-formation summer camps form part of the program.

Quick-Response Disaster Relief Mission
CBN Asia provides aid to victims of earthquakes, floods, fires, and other natural and man-made disasters, such as the flood in Anhui, China in August 1999, the earthquake in Taiwan in September 1999, the Mayon Volcano eruption in the Philippines in March 2000, and the Payatas trashslide in July 2000.

Medical Mission for Unreached, Underserved
Provides a diverse range of medical services, including general medical treatment, dentistry, out-patient surgery, and health education to address the unmet medical needs of underserved communities.

CBN Asia Prayer Center
The Prayer Center conducts one day trainer's training seminars here and abroad in response to requests made by various groups planning to establish their own prayer centers . In the past, a counseling team was sent to different provinces in the Philippines and other Asian countries such as Taiwan, Hong Kong, Malaysia, Singapore, and India to conduct training seminars and train up counseling centers handling common problem situations and trauma cases.

Filmography
CBN Asia produced to have telefilm and documentary which occasionally aired on GMA Network and ABS-CBN, usually during the Holy Week (yearly).
Ang Sapi (1994)
Pangarap Kong Pasko (1994)
GMA Telesine Specials: Kung Saan Sisikat ang Araw (co-produced by CAN Television, April 9, 1995)
Huwad na Langit (1996)
Ano ang Kulay ng Pangarap? (March 23, 1997)
Yakapin Mo ang Liwanag (1998)
Lamat sa Puso (1999)
Sa Ngalan ng Anak (2006)
Tanikala (2009–present)
Ama Namin (March 29, 2013)
Ang Ikalawang Libro (April 1-2, 2010)
Bihag ng Kadiliman (2009)
Buyonero (March 25, 2016, re-aired April 18, 2019)
Habang May Ngayon (April 1, 2021)
Hatol (April 18, 2014)
Isa Pang Hiling (April 2, 2021)
It's Unfair (March 29, 2018)
Kalbaryo (March 26, 2016)
Kublihan (April 19, 2019)
Kulam (April 21, 2011)
Liwanag sa Dapithapon (March 28, 2013, re-aired April 19, 2014)
My Sister, My Lover (April 17, 2014)
Nuno (April 14, 2017, re-aired March 31, 2018)
Paghilom (April 15, 2022)
Panata (April 23, 2011)
Pilat (March 30, 2018)
Sa Isang Iglap (April 2, 2015, re-aired March 24, 2016)
Sais-Katorse (April 13, 2017, re-aired March 31, 2018)
Suklob (April 10, 2020)
Tugon sa Dalangin (April 14, 2022)
Unos (April 5, 2012)
Wasak (April 22, 2011, re-aired April 7, 2012, April 15, 2017)
Gulong (2010)
Tinig (October 7, 2012)
In My Father's Arms (April 14, 2017)
Wanda's Wonderful World (March 30, 2018)

See also
Christian Broadcasting Network 
The 700 Club 
Pat Robertson 
Gordon P. Robertson
Superbook
The Flying House

References

External links
CBN Asia's official website

Christian mass media companies
Evangelical television networks
Television networks in the Philippines
Television production companies of the Philippines
Television in Hong Kong
Television in Taiwan
Television in Malaysia
Television in Singapore
Television in China
1994 establishments in the Philippines